Zeitgeist ApS is a Danish independent film production company created in 1997 by producer Søren Juul Petersen.

It has produced a number of theatrical feature films.

Zeitgeist remained one of Denmark's very few independent film companies for a number of years. The company since declared bankruptcy after the unsuccessful production of the Danish horror film Skavengers (2012).

Filmography 
Skyggen / Webmaster (1998)
Regel nr. 1 (2003)
Erik, of het klein insectenboek (2004)
Af banen / We Are the Champions (2005)
Remix (2008)

Sources 
Official website
 

Film production companies of Denmark
Mass media companies based in Copenhagen